Robert Clifford "Bob" Pelletier (May 8, 1933 – June 23, 2016) was an American entrepreneur and businessman. He was a pioneer of financial market data and trading analysis and the founder and CEO of Commodity Systems Inc.



Early life
Pelletier had a background in statistics, probability theory, and analytical modeling, worked in the Advanced Analytical Methods Laboratories at the General Electric Co. in New York, and consulted for the US Navy in Hawaii under Planning Research Corp.

Market data

Business
In 1969, Pelletier founded Commodity Systems, Inc., also known as CSI Data. The corporate headquarters were soon established in Boca Raton, Florida. CSI strived to provide clean end-of-day market data that was checked for errors. Pelletier said "If you’re testing data, you want it to be correct when you initially receive it” Pelletier was one of the first users of the Mitel SX-50 phone switching system, which he used to feed data to his customers from four Texas Instruments 990 microcomputers and one Convergent Technologies supermicrocomputer.

Perpetual Contracts 
In 1970, Pelletier developed a continuous price series which was trademarked "Perpetual Contracts". It is a weighted average between two futures contracts. It provided a smooth series that was ideal for back-testing futures trading systems.

References 

1933 births
2016 deaths
Businesspeople from Syracuse, New York
American financial businesspeople
20th-century American businesspeople